In mathematics, the Barban–Davenport–Halberstam theorem is a statement about the distribution of prime numbers in an arithmetic progression.  It is known that in the long run primes are distributed equally across possible progressions with the same difference.  Theorems of the Barban–Davenport–Halberstam type give estimates for the error term, determining how close to uniform the distributions are.

Statement
Let a be coprime to q and

be a weighted count of primes in the arithmetic progression a mod q.  We have

where φ is Euler's totient function and the error term E is small compared to x.  We take a sum of squares of error terms

Then we have

This form of the theorem is due to Gallagher.

See also
 Bombieri–Vinogradov theorem
 Elliott–Halberstam conjecture

References
 

Theorems in analytic number theory